Acacia confusa is a perennial tree native to South-East Asia. Some common names for it are acacia petit feuille, Ayangile, small Philippine acacia, Formosa acacia (Taiwan acacia), Philippine Wattle, and Formosan koa. It grows to a height of 15 m. The tree has become very common in many tropical Pacific areas, including Hawaii, where the species is considered invasive.

Uses
The wood has a density of about 0.75 g/cm3. In Taiwan, its wood was used to make support beams for underground mines. Acacia confusa is challenging to work and for this reason was traditionally burned as firewood or turned into charcoal in Taiwan. In later years it was exported to China to be made into wood flooring for the American market. At its height Taiwan exported more than 1,000 containers of Taiwan acacia to China. More recently it has been used domestically to produce high value wood products like musical instruments, furniture, and bathtubs.

The wood is also converted to charcoal for family use. The plant is used in traditional medicine and is available from herbal medicine shops (草藥店) in Taiwan, but there has been no clinical study to support its effectiveness.

Phytochemicals 
Phytochemicals found in Acacia confusa:

Root bark
N-Methyltryptamine
N,N-Dimethyltryptamine

Seeds

Oxalyldiaminopropionic acid (α-amino-β-oxalylaminopropionic acid), which can cause neurological damage, paralysis, and death.

Stems
N-Methyltryptamine, 0.04%

Varieties 
Acacia confusa var. inamurai Hayata

See also
List of Acacia species
Flora of the Philippines
Forestry in Taiwan

References

External links 

Erowid Acacia vault
Acacia confusa at DMT-Nexus wiki
Acacia confusa Merr. Medicinal Plant Images Database (School of Chinese Medicine, Hong Kong Baptist University)  

confusa
Medicinal plants of Asia
Least concern plants
Ayahuasca
Entheogens
Herbal and fungal hallucinogens
Psychedelic tryptamine carriers